The 2020 season is Kawasaki Frontale's 16th consecutive season in the J1 League, which they won for their third league title in four seasons. They also will compete in the Emperor's Cup and J.League Cup, the latter of which they are defending champions.

Squad
As of 20 July 2020.

Transfers

Transfers in

Transfers out

Competitions

J1 League

Table

Results summary

Results by matchday

Matches

Emperor's Cup

Results

J.League Cup

Group stage

Matches

Honors

Individual 

 J. League Best Eleven (9): Jung Sung-ryong, Miki Yamane, Jesiel, Shogo Taniguchi, Kyohei Noborizato, Hidemasa Morita, Ao Tanaka, Akihiro Ienaga, Kaoru Mitoma
 J. League Best Eleven finalists (13): Jung Sung-ryong, Miki Yamane, Jesiel, Shogo Taniguchi, Kyohei Noborizato, Hidemasa Morita, Ao Tanaka, Akihiro Ienaga, Kaoru Mitoma, Ryota Oshima, Yasuto Wakizaka, Yū Kobayashi, Leandro Damião

Statistics

Goal scorers

Clean sheets

References

Kawasaki Frontale
Kawasaki Frontale seasons